Richard Blumenthal (born February 13, 1946) is an American lawyer and politician who is the senior United States senator from Connecticut, a seat he has held since 2011. A member of the Democratic Party, he is one of the wealthiest members of the Senate, with a net worth over $100 million. He was Attorney General of Connecticut from 1991 to 2011.

Born in Brooklyn, New York, Blumenthal attended Riverdale Country School, a private school in the Bronx. He graduated from Harvard College, where he was editor-in-chief of The Harvard Crimson. He studied for a year at Trinity College, Cambridge, in England before attending Yale Law School, where he was editor-in-chief of the Yale Law Journal. From 1970 to 1976, Blumenthal served in the United States Marine Corps Reserve, attaining the rank of sergeant.

After law school, Blumenthal passed the bar and served as administrative assistant and law clerk for several Washington, D.C. figures. From 1977 to 1981, he was United States Attorney for the District of Connecticut. In the early 1980s he worked in private law practice, including as volunteer counsel for the NAACP Legal Defense Fund.

Blumenthal served one term in the Connecticut House of Representatives from 1985 to 1987; in 1986 he was elected to the Connecticut Senate and began service in 1987. He was elected Attorney General of Connecticut in 1990 and served for 20 years. During this period political observers speculated about him as a contender for governor of Connecticut, but he never pursued the office.

Blumenthal announced his 2010 run for U.S. Senate after incumbent Senator Chris Dodd announced his retirement. He faced Linda McMahon, a professional wrestling magnate, in the 2010 election, winning with 55% of the vote. He was sworn in on January 5, 2011. After Joe Lieberman retired in 2013, Blumenthal became Connecticut's senior senator. He was reelected in 2016 with 63.2% of the vote, becoming the first person to receive more than a million votes in a statewide election in Connecticut.

Early life and education
Blumenthal was born into a Jewish family in Brooklyn, New York, the son of Jane (née Rosenstock) and Martin Blumenthal. At age 17, Martin Blumenthal immigrated to the United States from Frankfurt, Germany; Jane was raised in Omaha, Nebraska, graduated from Radcliffe College, and became a social worker. Martin Blumenthal had a career in financial services and became president of a commodities trading firm. Jane's father, Fred "Fritz" Rosenstock, raised cattle, and as youths Blumenthal and his brother often visited their grandfather's farm. Blumenthal's brother David Blumenthal is a doctor and health care policy expert who became president of the Commonwealth Fund.

Blumenthal attended Riverdale Country School in the Riverdale section of the Bronx. He then attended Harvard College, from which he graduated in 1967 with an A.B. degree magna cum laude and membership in Phi Beta Kappa. As an undergraduate, he was editorial chairman of The Harvard Crimson. Blumenthal was a summer intern reporter for The Washington Post in the London Bureau. He was selected for a Fiske Fellowship, which allowed him to study at Trinity College of the University of Cambridge in England for one year after graduation from Harvard.

In 1973, Blumenthal received his J.D. degree from Yale Law School, where he was editor-in-chief of the Yale Law Journal. At Yale, he was classmates with future President Bill Clinton and future Secretary of State Hillary Clinton. One of his co-editors of the Yale Law Journal was future United States Secretary of Labor Robert Reich. He was also a classmate of future Supreme Court Justice Clarence Thomas and radio host Michael Medved.

Military service and controversy
Blumenthal received five draft deferments during the Vietnam War, first educational deferments, then deferments based on his occupation. In April 1970, Blumenthal enlisted in the United States Marine Corps Reserve which, The New York Times reported, "virtually guaranteed that he would not be sent to Vietnam". He served in units in Washington, D.C., and Connecticut from 1970 to 1976, attaining the rank of sergeant.

During his 2010 Senate campaign, news report videos that showed Blumenthal claiming he had served in Vietnam created a controversy. Blumenthal denied having intentionally misled voters, but acknowledged having occasionally "misspoken" about his service record. He later apologized to voters for remarks about his military service which he said had not been "clear or precise".

Early political career
Blumenthal served as administrative assistant to Senator Abraham A. Ribicoff, as aide to Daniel P. Moynihan when Moynihan was Assistant to President Richard Nixon, and as a law clerk to Judge Jon O. Newman, U.S. District Court of the District of Connecticut, and to Supreme Court Justice Harry A. Blackmun.

Before becoming attorney general, Blumenthal was a partner in the law firm of Cummings & Lockwood, and subsequently in the law firm of Silver, Golub & Sandak. In December 1982, while still at Cummings & Lockwood, he created and chaired the Citizens Crime Commission of Connecticut, a private, nonprofit organization. From 1981 to 1986, he was a volunteer counsel for the NAACP Legal Defense Fund.

At age 31, Blumenthal was appointed United States Attorney for the District of Connecticut, serving from 1977 to 1981. As the chief federal prosecutor of that state, he successfully prosecuted many major cases involving drug traffickers, organized crime, white collar criminals, civil rights violators, consumer fraud, and environmental pollution.

In 1982, he married Cynthia Allison Malkin. She is the daughter of real estate investor Peter L. Malkin. Her maternal grandfather was lawyer and philanthropist Lawrence Wien.

In 1984, when he was 38, Blumenthal was elected to the Connecticut House of Representatives, representing the 145th district. In 1987, he won a special election to fill a vacancy in the 27th district of the Connecticut Senate, at age 41. Blumenthal resided in Stamford, Connecticut.

In the 1980s, Blumenthal testified in the state legislature in favor of abolishing Connecticut's death penalty statute. He did so after representing Joseph Green Brown, a Florida death row inmate who was found to have been wrongly convicted. Blumenthal succeeded in staving off Brown's execution just 15 hours before it was scheduled to take place, and gained a new trial for Brown.

Attorney General of Connecticut
Blumenthal was elected the 23rd Attorney General of Connecticut in 1990 and reelected in 1994, 1998, 2002 and 2006. On October 10, 2002, he was awarded the Raymond E. Baldwin Award for Public Service by the Quinnipiac University School of Law.

Tenure

Pequot land annexation bid
In May 1995, Blumenthal and the state of Connecticut filed lawsuits challenging a decision by the Department of the Interior to approve a bid by the federally recognized Mashantucket Pequot for annexation of 165 acres of land in the towns of Ledyard, North Stonington and Preston. The Pequot were attempting to have the land placed in a federal trust, a legal designation to provide them with land for their sovereign control, as long years of colonization had left them landless. Blumenthal argued that the Interior Department's decision in support of this action was "fatally, legally flawed, and unfair" and that "it would unfairly remove land from the tax rolls of the surrounding towns and bar local control over how the land is used, while imposing [a] tremendous burden." The tribe announced the withdrawal of the land annexation petition in February 2002.

Interstate air pollution
In 1997, Blumenthal and Governor John G. Rowland petitioned the United States Environmental Protection Agency (EPA) to address interstate air pollution problems created from Midwest and southeastern sources. The petition was filed in accordance with Section 126 of the Clean Air Act, which allows a state to request pollution reductions from out-of-state sources that contribute significantly to its air quality problems.

In 2003, Blumenthal and the attorneys general of eight other states (New York, Maine, Maryland, Massachusetts, New Hampshire, New Jersey, Rhode Island, and Vermont) filed a federal lawsuit against the Bush administration for "endangering air quality by gutting a critical component of the federal Clean Air Act." The suit alleged that changes in the act would have exempted thousands of industrial air pollution sources from the act's New Source Review provision and that the new rules and regulations would lead to an increase in air pollution.

Tobacco
While attorney general, Blumenthal was one of the leaders of a 46-state lawsuit against the tobacco industry, which alleged that the companies involved had deceived the public about the dangers of smoking. He argued that the state of Connecticut should be reimbursed for Medicaid expenses related to smoking. In 1998, the tobacco companies reached a $246 billion national settlement, giving the 46 states involved 25 years of reimbursement payments. Connecticut's share of the settlement was estimated at $3.6 billion.

In December 2007, Blumenthal filed suit against RJ Reynolds, alleging that a 2007 Camel advertising spread in Rolling Stone magazine used cartoons in violation of the master tobacco settlement, which prohibited the use of cartoons in cigarette advertising because they entice children and teenagers to smoke. The company paid the state of Connecticut $150,000 to settle the suit and agreed to end the advertising campaign.

Microsoft lawsuit
In May 1998, Blumenthal and the attorneys general of 19 other states and the District of Columbia filed an anti-trust lawsuit against Microsoft, accusing it of abusing its monopoly power to stifle competition. The suit, which centered on Microsoft's Windows 98 operating system and its contractual restrictions imposed on personal computer manufacturers to tie the operating system to its Internet Explorer browser, was eventually merged with a federal case brought by the United States Department of Justice (DOJ) under Attorney General Janet Reno.

A 2000 landmark federal court decision ruled that Microsoft had violated antitrust laws, and the court ordered that the company be broken up. In 2001, the federal appeals court agreed, but rather than break up the company, it sent the case to a new judge to hold hearings and determine appropriate remedies. Remedies were later proposed by Blumenthal and eight other attorneys general; these included requiring that Microsoft license an unbundled version of Windows in which middleware and operating system code were not commingled.

In 2001, the Bush administration's DOJ settled with Microsoft in an agreement criticized by many states and other industry experts as insufficient. In November 2002, a federal court ruling imposed those same remedies. --> In August 2007, Blumenthal and five other states and the District of Columbia filed a report alleging that the federal settlement with Microsoft and court-imposed Microsoft remedies had failed to adequately reduce Microsoft's monopoly.

Stanley Works
On May 10, 2002, Blumenthal and Connecticut State Treasurer Denise L. Nappier helped to stop the hostile takeover of New Britain-based Stanley Works, a major Connecticut employer, by filing a lawsuit alleging that the move to reincorporate in Bermuda based on a shareholder's vote of May 9 was "rife with voting irregularities." The agreement to temporarily halt the move was signed by New Britain Superior Court Judge Marshall Berger. On June 3 Blumenthal referred the matter to the U.S. Securities and Exchange Commission (SEC) for further investigation and on June 25 he testified before the U.S. House Committee on Ways and Means that "Longtime American corporations with operations in other countries can dodge tens of millions of dollars in federal taxes by the device of reincorporating in another country" by "simply [filing] incorporation papers in a country with friendly tax laws, open a post-office box and hold an annual meeting there" and that Stanley Works, along with "Cooper Industries, Seagate Technologies, Ingersoll-Rand and PricewaterhouseCoopers Consulting, to name but a few, have also become pseudo-foreign corporations for the sole purpose of saving tax dollars." Blumenthal said, "Corporations proposing to reincorporate to Bermuda, such as Stanley, often tell shareholders that there is no material difference in the law", but said that this was not the case and was misleading to their shareholders. In order to rectify this situation he championed the Corporate Patriot Enforcement Act to close tax loopholes.

Tomasso Group and Rowland corruption
Blumenthal was involved in a series of lawsuits against associates of Connecticut Governor Rowland and the various entities of the Tomasso Group over Tomasso's bribing of state officials, including Rowland, in exchange for the awarding of lucrative state contracts. Blumenthal subpoenaed Tomasso Brothers Inc.; Tomasso Brothers Construction Co.; TBI Construction Co. LLC; Tunxis Plantation Country Club; Tunxis Management Co.; Tunxis Management Co. II; and Tenergy Water LLC (all part of the Tomasso Group). Lawyers for the Tomasso Group argued that the attorney general had no special power to look into the operations of private firms under whistleblower law as no actual whistleblowers had come forward and all incriminating testimony was in related federal cases. Connecticut law requires the attorney general to both be the attorney for the state and investigate the state government's misdeeds, and the rules governing the office did not adequately address this inherent conflict of interest. The state's case against the Tomasso Group failed but federal investigations ended in prison sentences for the Group's president, for Rowland, and for a number of his associates. The Tomasso Group stopped bidding on state contracts to avoid a substantial legal challenge from Blumenthal under newly written compliance statutes.

Charter schools lawsuit
In September 1999, Blumenthal announced a lawsuit against Robin Barnes, the president and treasurer of New Haven-based charter school the Village Academy, for serious financial mismanagement of the state-subsidized charitable organization. Citing common law, the suit sought to recover money misspent and serious damages resulting from Barnes's alleged breach of duty.

In a Connecticut Supreme Court decision, Blumenthal v. Barnes (2002), a unanimous court determined that the state attorney general could act using only the powers specifically authorized by the state legislature, and that since the attorney general's jurisdiction is defined by statute rather than common law, Blumenthal lacked the authority to cite common law as the basis for filing suit against Barnes. Despite this ruling, Blumenthal announced that he intended to pursue a separate 2000 lawsuit against the school's trustees filed on behalf of the State Department of Education.

Regional transmission organization
In 2003 Blumenthal, former Massachusetts Attorney General Tom Reilly, Rhode Island Attorney General Patrick C. Lynch, and consumer advocates from Connecticut, Maine, and New Hampshire opposed "the formation of a regional transmission organization (RTO) that would merge three Northeast and mid-Atlantic power operators, called Independent Service Operators (ISOs), into a single super-regional RTO." In a press release, he said, "This fatally flawed RTO proposal will raise rates, reduce accountability and reward market manipulation. It will increase the power and profits of transmission operators with an immediate $40 million price tag for consumers."

Gina Kolb lawsuit
In 2004, Blumenthal sued Computer Plus Center of East Hartford and its owner, Gina Kolb, on behalf of the state. It was alleged that CPC overcharged $50 per computer, $500,000 in total, on a three-year, $17.2 million contract to supply computers to the state. Blumenthal sued for $1.75 million. Kolb was arrested in 2004 and charged with first-degree larceny. Kolb later countersued, claiming the state had grossly abused its power. Kolb was initially awarded $18.3 million in damages, but Blumenthal appealed the decision and the damages initially awarded were reduced to $1.83 million. Superior Court judge Barry Stevens described the jury's initial award of $18.3 million as a "shocking injustice" and said it was "influenced by partiality or mistake."

Big East and ACC
Blumenthal played a pivotal role in the expansion of the Atlantic Coast Conference and the departures of Boston College, Miami, and Virginia Tech from the Big East. He led efforts by the Big East football schools (Virginia Tech, Rutgers, Pittsburgh, and West Virginia) in legal proceedings against the Atlantic Coast Conference, the University of Miami and Boston College, accusing them of improper disclosure of confidential information and of conspiring to dismantle the Big East. According to Blumenthal, the case was pursued because "the future of the Big East Conference was at risk—the stakes huge for both state taxpayers and the university's good name." The suits cost the schools involved $2.2 million in the first four months of litigation. The lawsuit against the ACC was initially dismissed on jurisdictional grounds but was subsequently refiled. A declaratory judgment by the Supreme Judicial Court of Massachusetts exonerated Boston College in the matter. Virginia Tech accepted an invitation from the ACC and withdrew from the suit to remove itself from the awkward position of suing its new conference. An out-of-court $5 million settlement was eventually reached, which included a $1 million exit fee that Boston College was required to pay the Big East under the league's constitution.

Some have speculated that the lawsuit was one of the biggest reasons that the University of Connecticut was not sought after by the ACC during its 2011 additions of then-Big East members Syracuse and Pittsburgh. UConn is a member of the less lucrative American Athletic Conference, the successor to the original Big East.

Interstate 84
On October 2, 2006, Blumenthal launched an investigation of a botched reconstruction project of Interstate 84 in Waterbury and Cheshire. The original contractor for the job, L.G. DeFelice, went out of business and it was later revealed that hundreds of storm drains had been improperly installed. Blumenthal subsequently announced lawsuits against L.G. DeFelice and the Maguire Group, the engineering firm that inspected the project. United States Fidelity & Guaranty, the insurer behind the performance bond for the I-84 construction, agreed to pay $17.5 million to settle the claims. Under the agreement, the state of Connecticut retained the right to sue L.G. DeFelice for additional funds. In 2009, the bonding company agreed to pay an additional $4.6 million settlement, bringing the total award to $22.1 million ($30,000 more than the repair costs).

Lyme disease guidelines investigation
In November 2006, Blumenthal tried, as Paul A. Offit described it, "to legislate a disease, Chronic Lyme, into existence". He launched an antitrust investigation into the Infectious Diseases Society of America's (IDSA's) 2006 guidelines regarding the treatment of Lyme disease. Responding to concerns from chronic Lyme disease advocacy groups, Blumenthal claimed the IDSA guidelines would "severely constrict choices and legitimate diagnosis and treatment options for patients." The medical validity of the IDSA guidelines was not challenged, and a journalist writing in Nature Medicine suggested some IDSA members may not have disclosed potential conflicts of interest, while a Forbes piece described Blumenthal's investigation as "intimidation" of scientists by an elected official with close ties to Lyme advocacy groups. The Journal of the American Medical Association described the decision as an example of the "politicization of health policy" that went against the weight of scientific evidence and may have a chilling effect on future decisions by medical associations. In 2008, Blumenthal ended the investigation after the IDSA agreed to conduct a review of the guidelines. In 2010, an eight-member independent review panel unanimously agreed that the original 2006 guideline recommendations were "medically and scientifically justified" in the light of the evidence. The committee did not change any of the earlier recommendations but did alter some of the language in an executive summary of the findings. Blumenthal said he would review the final report.

Internet pornography, prostitution, and sexual predators

MySpace/Facebook
In March 2006, Blumenthal noted that more than seven incidents of sexual assault in Connecticut had been linked directly to MySpace contacts. Earlier that year, Blumenthal and attorneys general in at least five other states were involved in discussions with MySpace that resulted in the implementation of technological changes aimed at protecting children from pornography and child predators on the company's website. At Blumenthal's urging, MySpace installed a link to free blocking software ("K9 Web Protection"), but in May 2006, Blumenthal announced that the site had failed to make the program easy to find and that it was not clearly labeled. He also urged MySpace to take further steps to safeguard children, including purging deep links to pornography and inappropriate material, tougher age verification, and banning users under 16.

Blumenthal was co-chair, along with North Carolina Attorney General Roy Cooper, of the State Attorney General Task Force on Social Networking. In 2008, the attorneys general commissioned the Internet Safety Technical Task Force report, which researched "ways to help squash the onslaught of sexual predators targeting younger social-networking clients".

Blumenthal's office subpoenaed MySpace for information about the number of registered sex offenders on its site. In 2009, MySpace revealed that over a two-year span it had roughly 90,000 members who were registered sex offenders (nearly double what MySpace officials had originally estimated one year earlier). Blumenthal accused MySpace of having "monstrously inadequate counter-measures" to prevent sex offenders from creating MySpace profiles.

Blumenthal and Cooper secured agreements from MySpace and Facebook to make their sites safer. Both implemented dozens of safeguards, including finding better ways to verify users' ages, banning convicted sex offenders, and limiting the ability of older users to search for members under 18.

Craigslist
In March 2008, Blumenthal issued a letter to Craigslist attorneys demanding that the website cease allowing postings for erotic services, which he claimed promoted prostitution, and accused the site of "turning a blind eye" to the problem. He worked with Craigslist and a group of 40 attorneys general to create new measures on the site designed to thwart ads for prostitution and other illegal sexual activities. In April 2009, Craigslist came under the scrutiny of law enforcement agencies following the arrest of Philip Markoff (the "Craigslist Killer"), suspected of killing a 25-year-old masseuse he met through Craigslist at a Boston hotel. Blumenthal subsequently called for a series of specific measures to fight prostitution and pornography on Craigslist—including steep financial penalties for rule breaking, and incentives for reporting wrongdoing. He said, "Craigslist has the means—and moral obligation—to stop the pimping and prostituting in plain sight."

Leading a coalition of 39 states, in May 2010 Blumenthal subpoenaed Craigslist as part of an investigation into whether the site was taking sufficient action to curb prostitution ads and whether it was profiting from them. He said that prostitution ads remained on the site despite previous assurances that they would be removed. The subpoena sought documents related to Craigslist's processes for reviewing potentially objectionable ads, as well as documents detailing the revenue gained from ads sold to Craigslist's erotic services and adult services categories. In August 2010, Blumenthal called on Craigslist to shut the section down permanently and take steps to eradicate prostitution ads from other parts of the site. He also called on Congress to alter a landmark communications law (the Communications Decency Act) that Craigslist has cited in defense of the ads.

Following continued pressure, Craigslist removed the adult services sections from its U.S. sites in September 2010 and from its international sites in December 2010. Blumenthal called the decision a victory against sexual exploitation of women and children, and against human trafficking connected to prostitution.

Blumenthal and other state attorneys general reached a settlement with Craigslist on the issue; the settlement called for the company to charge people via credit card for any ads that were suggestive in nature so the person could be tracked down if they were determined to be offering prostitution. But Blumenthal remarked that after the settlement, the ads continued to flourish using code words.

Terrorist surveillance program
In October 2007, Blumenthal and the attorneys general of four other states lobbied Congress to reject proposals to provide immunity from litigation to telecommunications firms that cooperated with the federal government's terrorist surveillance program following the September 11 attacks. In 2008 Congress passed and President George W. Bush signed into law a new terrorist surveillance bill including the telecom immunity provisions Blumenthal opposed.

Countrywide Financial
In August 2008, Blumenthal announced that Connecticut had joined California, Illinois and Florida in suing subprime mortgage lender Countrywide Financial (now owned by Bank of America) for fraudulent business practices. The suit alleged that Countrywide pushed consumers into "deceptive, unaffordable loans and workouts, and charged homeowners in default unjustified and excessive legal fees." According to Blumenthal, "Countrywide conned customers into loans that were clearly unaffordable and unsustainable, turning the American Dream of homeownership into a nightmare" and when consumers defaulted, "the company bullied them into workouts doomed to fail." He also claimed that Countrywide "crammed unconscionable legal fees into renegotiated loans, digging consumers deeper into debt" and "broke promises that homeowners could refinance, condemning them to hopelessly unaffordable loans." The lawsuit demanded that Countrywide make restitution to affected borrowers, give up improper gains and rescind, reform or modify all mortgages that broke state laws. It is also sought civil fines of up to $100,000 per violation of state banking laws, and up to $5,000 per violation of state consumer protection laws.

In October 2008, Bank of America initially agreed to settle the states' suits for $8.4 billion, and in February 2010, Countrywide mailed payments of $3,452.54 to 370 Connecticut residents. The settlement forced Bank of America to establish a $150 million fund to help repay borrowers whose homes had been foreclosed upon, $1.3 million of which went to Connecticut.

Blumenthal commented in defense of U.S. Senator and Senate Banking Committee chair Christopher Dodd, who had been harshly criticized for accepting a VIP loan from Countrywide, "there's no evidence of wrongdoing on [Mr. Dodd's] part any more than victims who were misled or deceived by Countrywide." In August 2010, Dodd was cleared by the Senate Ethics Committee, which found "no credible evidence" that he knowingly tried to use his status as a U.S. senator to receive loan terms not available to the public.

Global warming
Blumenthal has been a vocal advocate of the scientific consensus on climate change, that human activity is responsible for rising global temperatures and that prompt action to reduce greenhouse gas emissions must be taken. He has urged the Environmental Protection Agency to declare carbon dioxide a dangerous air pollutant. "I urge the new Obama EPA to declare carbon dioxide a danger to human health and welfare so we can at last begin addressing the potentially disastrous threat global warming poses to health, the environment and our economy. We must make up for lost time before it's too late to curb dangerous warming threatening to devastate the planet and human society." He has brought suit against a number of electric utilities in the Midwest, arguing that coal-burning power plants are generating excess  emissions. In 2009, the Second Circuit Court of Appeals agreed to allow Blumenthal's lawsuit to proceed. Blumenthal has said, "no reputable climate scientist disputes the reality of global warming. It is fact, plain and simple. Dithering will be disastrous."

Prospect of gubernatorial candidacy
Blumenthal was often considered a top prospect for the Democratic nominee for governor of Connecticut, but never ran for the office.

On March 18, 2007, Hartford Courant columnist Kevin Rennie reported that Blumenthal had become seriously interested in running for governor in 2010. On February 2, 2009, Blumenthal announced he would forgo a gubernatorial run and seek reelection that year as attorney general.

U.S. Senate

Elections

2010 

After Chris Dodd announced on January 6, 2010, that he would retire from the Senate at the end of his term, Blumenthal told the Associated Press that he would run in the election for Dodd's seat in November 2010. Later that day, President Barack Obama and Vice President Joe Biden called Blumenthal to express their best wishes.

The same day, Public Policy Polling released a poll they took on the two preceding evenings, including races where Blumenthal was paired against each of the three most-mentioned Republicans contending for their party's nomination for the seat. He led by at least 30% in each hypothetical race: against Rob Simmons (59%–28%), against Linda McMahon (60%–28%), and against Peter Schiff (63%–23%), with a 4.3% margin of error cited. Rasmussen Reports also polled after Blumenthal announced his candidacy and found a somewhat more competitive race, but with Blumenthal holding a strong lead.

A February poll by Rasmussen found that Blumenthal held leads of 19 against Simmons and 20 against McMahon, and that Republicans had made up little ground since the initial Rasmussen poll after Blumenthal announced. On May 21, Blumenthal received the Democratic nomination by acclamation.

The New York Times reported that Blumenthal misspoke on at least one occasion by saying he'd served with the military "in Vietnam". Video emerged of him speaking to a group of veterans and supporters in March 2008 in Norwalk, saying, in reference to supporting troops returning from Iraq and Afghanistan, "We have learned something important since the days that I served in Vietnam." There were also other occasions where he accurately described his military service. At a 2008 ceremony in Shelton, Connecticut, he said, "I served during the Vietnam era... I remember the taunts, the insults, sometimes even physical abuse."

Blumenthal's commanding officer in 1974 and 1975, Larry Baldino of Woodbridge, addressed the controversy in a letter to the editor in the New Haven Register. Baldino wrote that the misleading statement was too "petty" to be the basis for supporting or not supporting Blumenthal. Baldino further called Blumenthal "good-natured" and "one of the best Marines with whom I ever worked".

Days after the nomination, Quinnipiac University Polling Institute polling indicated that Blumenthal held a 25-point lead over McMahon. The Cook Political Report changed its assessment of the race to Leans Democratic, making Blumenthal the favored candidate over McMahon.

Blumenthal won the November 2 election, defeating McMahon 55% to 43%.

2016

August Wolf, a bond salesman and former Olympian, was the only declared Republican candidate running against Blumenthal in the 2016 Senate election.

In August 2015, economist Larry Kudlow threatened to run against Blumenthal if Blumenthal voted in favor of the Iran Nuclear Deal.

According to a pair of Quinnipiac polls on October 15, 2015, Blumenthal had a 34-point lead over Kudlow and a 35-point lead over Wolf.

Blumenthal was reelected with 63% of the vote against Republican state representative Dan Carter, becoming the first person in Connecticut's history to receive over a million votes in a single election.

2022

In November 2020, Blumenthal announced that he would seek reelection in 2022. In the general election, he defeated Leora Levy, who defeated former Connecticut House Minority Leader Themis Klarides in the Republican primary.

Tenure

Blumenthal was sworn into the 112th United States Congress on January 5, 2011. He announced plans to return to Connecticut every weekend to join a "listening tour" of his home state.

In March 2012, Blumenthal and New York Senator Chuck Schumer gained national attention after they called upon Attorney General Eric Holder and the Department of Justice to investigate practices by employers to require Facebook passwords for employee applicants and workers.

Blumenthal worked with Senator Mark Kirk to eliminate pensions for members of Congress who are convicted of felonies while serving in office.

In Blumenthal v. Trump, Blumenthal and Representative John Conyers Jr. led a group of 196 congressmen in filing a federal lawsuit accusing President Trump of violating the emoluments clause of the US Constitution.

In the wake of the 2021 storming of the United States Capitol, Blumenthal blamed Trump, saying that Trump "incited, instigated and supported" the attack. He called for Vice President Mike Pence to invoke the Twenty-fifth Amendment to the United States Constitution. Blumenthal also requested an investigation into the lack of response from law enforcement and the military.

In December 2021, Blumenthal gave a speech honoring three local labor activists at an awards ceremony in New Haven that was hosted by the Connecticut People's World Committee, an affiliate of the Connecticut Communist Party. After criticism from national Republican politicians and conservative media outlets, Blumenthal said that he is "a strong supporter and believer in American capitalism" and would not have attended had he known of the group's Communist ties.

Committee assignments

 Committee on Armed Services
 Subcommittee on Cybersecurity
Subcommittee on Readiness and Management Support
 Subcommittee on SeaPower
 Committee on Commerce, Science, and Transportation
 Subcommittee on Consumer Protection, Product Safety, and Data Security (Chairman)
 Committee on the Judiciary
 Subcommittee on Antitrust, Competition Policy and Consumer Rights
Subcommittee on Human Rights and the Law
Subcommittee on Immigration, Citizenship, and Border Safety
Subcommittee on the Constitution (Chair)
 Committee on Veterans' Affairs

 Special Committee on Aging

Caucus memberships
Expand Social Security Caucus
Senate Oceans Caucus
Senate Ukraine Caucus

Legislation sponsored
The following is an incomplete list of legislation that Blumenthal has sponsored:
 Affordable College Textbook Act (S. 1864; 115th Congress)

Political positions
The American Conservative Union gave him a 3% lifetime conservative rating in 2019.

Abortion 
Blumenthal is pro-choice. He supports efforts to make it a crime for demonstrators to block access to health clinics. He opposed efforts by Walmart to ban the sale of emergency contraception and supports requirements that pharmacies fill birth control prescriptions. He supports federal funding for family planning clinics. After Roe v. Wade was overturned in June 2022, Blumenthal said the decision "strips women of the freedom to make their own health care decisions & puts that power in the hands of the government."

Agriculture 
In March 2019, Blumenthal was one of 38 senators to sign a letter to United States Secretary of Agriculture Sonny Perdue warning that dairy farmers "have continued to face market instability and are struggling to survive the fourth year of sustained low prices" and urging his department to "strongly encourage these farmers to consider the Dairy Margin Coverage program."

In May 2019, Blumenthal and eight other Democratic senators sent Perdue a letter criticizing the USDA for purchasing pork from JBS USA, writing that it was "counterproductive and contradictory" for companies to receive funding from "U.S. taxpayer dollars intended to help American farmers struggling with this administration's trade policy." The senators requested the department "ensure these commodity purchases are carried out in a manner that most benefits the American farmer's bottom line—not the business interests of foreign corporations."

In June 2019, Blumenthal and 18 other Democratic senators sent a letter to USDA Inspector General (IG) Phyllis K. Fong requesting that the IG investigate USDA instances of retaliation and political decision-making and asserting that not to conduct an investigation would mean these "actions could be perceived as a part of this administration's broader pattern of not only discounting the value of federal employees, but suppressing, undermining, discounting, and wholesale ignoring scientific data produced by their own qualified scientists."

Antitrust, competition and corporate regulation 
In June 2019, Blumenthal was one of six Democrats led by Amy Klobuchar to sign letters to the Federal Trade Commission (FTC) and the Department of Justice recounting that many of them had "called on both the FTC and the Justice Department to investigate potential anticompetitive activity in these markets, particularly following the significant enforcement actions taken by foreign competition enforcers against these same companies" and requesting that both agencies confirm whether they had opened antitrust investigations into each of the companies and that both agencies pledge to publicly release any such investigations' findings.

Arbitration clauses 
Blumenthal is one of Congress's most vocal critics of arbitration clauses and class action waivers. He was the leading Senate sponsor of the Forced Arbitration Injustice Repeal Act, alongside Representative Hank Johnson, which would ban the use of the clauses in consumer contracts. Blumenthal additionally introduced separate legislation with Representative Conor Lamb aimed to prohibit Amtrak from enforcing such clauses in its customer agreements.

Aviation safety
Blumenthal called for the Federal Aviation Administration (FAA) to temporarily ground all Boeing 737 MAX 8 aircraft in the United States until an investigation into the cause of the crash of Ethiopian Airlines Flight 302 is complete.

Child care 
In 2019, Blumenthal and 34 other senators introduced the Child Care for Working Families Act, a bill that created 770,000 new child care jobs and ensured families under 75% of the state median income did not pay for child care with higher-earning families having to pay "their fair share for care on a sliding scale, regardless of the number of children they have." The legislation also supported universal access to high-quality preschool programs for all 3- and 4-year-olds and changed the child care workforce compensation and training to aid both teachers and caregivers.

Children's programming 
In 2019, following the Federal Communications Commission's announcement of rules changes to children's programming by modifying the Children's Television Act of 1990, Blumenthal and eight other Democratic senators signed a letter to FCC Chairman Ajit Pai that expressed concern that the proposed changes "would limit the reach of educational content available to children and have a particular damaging effect on youth in low-income and minority communities" and asserted that the new rules would see a reduction in access to valuable educational content through over-the-air services.

Disaster relief 
In April 2018, Blumenthal was one of five Democratic senators to sign a letter to FEMA administrator Brock Long calling on FEMA to enter an agreement with the United States Department of Housing and Urban Development that would "stand up the Disaster Housing Assistance Program and address the medium- and longer-term housing needs" of evacuees of Puerto Rico in the aftermath of Hurricane Maria. The senators wrote that "FEMA's refusal to use the tools at its disposal, including DHAP, to help these survivors is puzzling—and profoundly troubling" and that hundreds of hurricane survivors were susceptible to being left homeless in the event that FEMA and HUD continued to not work together.

Drug policy 
In February 2017, Blumenthal and 30 other senators signed a letter to Kaléo Pharmaceuticals in response to the opioid-overdose-reversing device Evzio rising in price from $690 in 2014 to $4,500 and requested the company provide the detailed price structure for Evzio, the number of devices Kaléo Pharmaceuticals set aside for donation, and the totality of federal reimbursements Evzio received in the previous year.

In March 2017, Blumenthal was one of 21 senators to sign a letter led by Ed Markey to Senate Majority Leader Mitch McConnell that noted that 12% of adult Medicaid beneficiaries had some form or a substance abuse disorder and that one third of treatment administered for opioid and other substance use disorders in the U.S. was financed through Medicaid and opined that the American Health Care Act could "very literally translate into a death spiral for those with opioid use disorders" due to inadequate coverage for substance abuse treatment.

In April 2019, Blumenthal was one of 11 senators to sign a letter to Juul CEO Kevin Burns asserting that the company had "lost what little remaining credibility the company had when it claimed to care about the public health" and that they would not rest until Juul's "dangerous products are out of the hands of our nation's children." The senators requested Juul list each of its advertising buys and detail the steps the company has taken to ensure its advertisements are not seen by people under 21 in addition to asking if Juul had purchased any social media influencers for product promotion.

Blumenthal has a "C" rating from NORML for his voting history regarding cannabis-related causes.

Economy 
In March 2019, Blumenthal led five Democratic senators in signing a letter to the Federal Trade Commission requesting it "use its rulemaking authority, along with other tools, in order to combat the scourge of non-compete clauses rigging our economy against workers" and arguing that incomplete clauses "harm employees by limiting their ability to find alternate work, which leaves them with little leverage to bargain for better wages or working conditions with their immediate employer." The senators added that the FTC had the responsibility of protecting both consumers and workers and needed to "act decisively" to address their concerns over "serious anti-competitive harms from the proliferation of non-competes in the economy."

EARN IT
On March 3, 2020, Blumenthal cosponsored a bill to make it difficult for people and organizations to use encryption under the EARN-IT Act of 2020.

In February 2022, Blumenthal and Lindsey Graham introduced bipartisan legislation, as part of the EARN IT Act, to incentivize tech companies to remove child sexual abuse material (CSAM) from their platforms and remove blanket immunity for violations of laws related to online child pornography.

Environment 
In June 2019, Blumenthal was one of 44 senators to introduce the International Climate Accountability Act, legislation that would prevent Trump from using funds in an attempt to withdraw from the Paris Agreement and directing the Trump administration to instead develop a strategic plan for the United States that would allow it to meet its commitment under the Paris Agreement.

Foreign relations

Central America 
In April 2019, Blumenthal was one of 34 senators to sign a letter to Trump encouraging him "to listen to members of your own Administration and reverse a decision that will damage our national security and aggravate conditions inside Central America", asserting that Trump had "consistently expressed a flawed understanding of U.S. foreign assistance" since becoming president and that he was "personally undermining efforts to promote U.S. national security and economic prosperity" by preventing the use of Fiscal Year 2018 national security funding. The senators argued that foreign assistance to Central American countries created less migration to the U.S., citing the funding's help in improving conditions in those countries.

China 
In April 2018, Blumenthal stated his support for "strong efforts to crack down on intellectual property theft and unfair trade practices by China or any other nation", but said that Trump was implementing "trade policy by tweet, reaction based on impulse and rash rhetoric that can only escalate tensions with all economic powers and lead to a trade war" and that U.S. actions through trade without a strategy or an endgame seemed "highly dangerous" to the American economy.

In June 2018, Blumenthal cosponsored a bipartisan bill that would reinstate penalties on ZTE for export control violations in addition to barring American government agencies from either purchasing or leasing equipment or services from ZTE or Huawei. The bill was offered as an amendment to the National Defense Authorization Act for 2019 and was in direct contrast to the Trump administration's announced intent to ease sanctions on ZTE.

In August 2018, Blumenthal and 16 other lawmakers urged the Trump administration to impose sanctions under the Global Magnitsky Act against Chinese officials who are responsible for human rights abuses against the Uyghur Muslim minority in the Xinjiang region. They wrote, "The detention of as many as a million or more Uyghurs and other predominantly Muslim ethnic minorities in 'political reeducation' centers or camps requires a tough, targeted, and global response."

In May 2019, Blumenthal was a cosponsor of the South China Sea and East China Sea Sanctions Act, a bipartisan bill reintroduced by Marco Rubio and Ben Cardin that was intended to disrupt China's consolidation or expansion of its claims of jurisdiction over both the sea and air space in disputed zones in the South China Sea.

In July 2019, Blumenthal was a cosponsor of the Defending America's 5G Future Act, a bill that would prevent Huawei from being removed from the "entity list" of the Commerce Department without an act of Congress and authorize Congress to block administration waivers for U.S. companies to do business with Huawei. The bill would also codify Trump's executive order from the previous May that empowered his administration to block foreign tech companies deemed a national security threat from conducting business in the United States.

Middle East 
In March 2017, Blumenthal co-sponsored the Israel Anti-Boycott Act (S.270), which made it a federal crime, punishable by a maximum sentence of 20 years imprisonment, for Americans to encourage or participate in boycotts against Israel and Israeli settlements in the occupied Palestinian territories if protesting actions by the Israeli government.

In March 2019, Blumenthal was one of nine Democratic senators to sign a letter to Salman of Saudi Arabia requesting the release of human rights lawyer Waleed Abu al-Khair and writer Raif Badawi, women's rights activists Loujain al-Hathloul and Samar Badawi, and Dr. Walid Fitaih. The senators wrote, "Not only have reputable international organizations detailed the arbitrary detention of peaceful activists and dissidents without trial for long periods, but the systematic discrimination against women, religious minorities and mistreatment of migrant workers and others has also been well-documented."

In October 2022, Saudi Arabia, with Russia, announced a cut of 2 million barrels a day of oil production at the OPEC+ meeting. Blumenthal accused Saudi Arabia of undermining U.S. efforts and helping to boost 2022 Russian invasion of Ukraine. In an opinion piece, he and Ro Khanna proposed to promptly pause the massive transfer of American warfare technology to Saudi Arabia and take a tougher stance against the kingdom.

Government shutdown 
In March 2019, Blumenthal and 38 other senators signed a letter to the Appropriations Committee opining that contractor workers and by extension their families "should not be penalized for a government shutdown that they did nothing to cause" while noting that there were bills in both chambers of Congress that would provide back pay to compensate contractor employees for lost wages, urging the Appropriations Committee "to include back pay for contractor employees in a supplemental appropriations bill for FY2019 or as part of the regular appropriations process for FY2020."

Guns

As of 2010, Blumenthal had a "F" rating from the National Rifle Association for his pro-gun-control voting record.

In response to the 2015 San Bernardino attack, Blumenthal gave his support for improved access to mental health resources and universal background checks.

In January 2016, Blumenthal was one of 18 senators to sign a letter to Thad Cochran and Barbara Mikulski requesting that the Labor, Health and Education subcommittee hold a hearing on whether to allow the Centers for Disease Control and Prevention (CDC) to fund a study of gun violence and "the annual appropriations rider that some have interpreted as preventing it" with taxpayer dollars. The senators noted their support for taking steps "to fund gun-violence research, because only the United States government is in a position to establish an integrated public-health research agenda to understand the causes of gun violence and identify the most effective strategies for prevention."

In the wake of the Orlando nightclub shooting, Blumenthal said, "The Senate's inaction on commonsense gun violence prevention makes it complicit in this public health crisis. Prayers and platitudes are insufficient. The American public is beseeching us to act on commonsense, sensible gun violence prevention measures, and we must heed that call."

In October 2016, Blumenthal participated in the Chris Murphy gun control filibuster, speaking in support of the Feinstein Amendment, which would have banned people known to be or suspected of being terrorists from buying guns. That same year, he stated his support for efforts to require toy or fake firearms to have orange parts so they could more easily be distinguished from real guns.

In response to the 2017 Las Vegas shooting, Blumenthal declared in an interview with Judy Woodruff, "we must break the grip of the NRA". He continued, "we can at least save lives. Would it have prevented the Las Vegas atrocity, that unspeakable tragedy? We will never know. But it might have, and we can definitely prevent such mass shootings by adopting these kinds of commonsense measures."

In 2018, Blumenthal was a cosponsor of the NICS Denial Notification Act, legislation developed in the aftermath of the Stoneman Douglas High School shooting that would require federal authorities to inform states within a day after a person failing the National Instant Criminal Background Check System attempted to buy a firearm.

In January 2019, Blumenthal was one of 40 senators to introduce the Background Check Expansion Act, a bill that would require background checks for either the sale or transfer of all firearms including all unlicensed sellers. Exceptions to the bill's background check requirement included transfers between members of law enforcement, loaning firearms for either hunting or sporting events on a temporary basis, providing firearms as gifts to members of one's immediate family, firearms being transferred as part of an inheritance, or giving a firearm to another person temporarily for immediate self-defense.

In June 2019, Blumenthal was one of four senators to cosponsor the Help Empower Americans to Respond (HEAR) Act, legislation that would ban suppressors being imported, sold, made, sent elsewhere or possessed and grant a silencer buyback program as well as include certain exceptions for current and former law enforcement personnel and others. The bill was intended to respond to the Virginia Beach shooting, where the perpetrator used a .45-caliber handgun with multiple extended magazines and a suppressor.

Health care 
In February 2019, Blumenthal and 22 other Democratic senators introduced the State Public Option Act, a bill that would authorize states to form a Medicaid buy-in program for all residents and thereby grant all denizens of the state the ability to buy into a state-driven Medicaid health insurance plan if they wished. Brian Schatz, a bill cosponsor, said the legislation would "unlock each state's Medicaid program to anyone who wants it, giving people a high-quality, low-cost public health insurance option", and that its goal was "to make sure that every single American has comprehensive health care coverage."

In June 2019, Blumenthal was one of eight senators to cosponsor the Territories Health Equity Act of 2019, legislation that would remove the cap on annual federal Medicaid funding and increase federal matching rate for Medicaid expenditures of territories along with more funds being provided for prescription drug coverage to low-income seniors in an attempt to equalize funding for American territories Puerto Rico, the Virgin Islands, Guam, American Samoa and the Northern Mariana Islands with that of U.S. states.

In June 2019, Blumenthal and 14 other senators introduced the Affordable Medications Act, legislation intended to promote transparency by mandating that pharmaceutical companies disclose the amount of money going to research and development, marketing and executives' salaries. The bill also abolished the restriction that stopped the federal Medicare program from using its buying power to negotiate lower drug prices for beneficiaries and hinder drug company monopoly practices used to keep prices high and disable less expensive generics entering the market.

In August 2019, Blumenthal was one of 19 senators to sign a letter to United States Secretary of the Treasury Steve Mnuchin and United States Secretary of Health and Human Services Alex Azar requesting data from the Trump administration in order to help states and Congress understand the potential consequences in the event that the Texas v. United States Affordable Care Act (ACA) lawsuit prevailed in courts, claiming that an overhaul of the present health care system would form "an enormous hole in the pocketbooks of the people we serve as well as wreck state budgets". That same month, Blumenthal, three other Senate Democrats, and Bernie Sanders signed a letter to Acting FDA Commissioner Ned Sharpless in response to Novartis falsifying data as part of an attempt to gain the FDA's approval for its new gene therapy Zolgensma, writing that it was "unconscionable that a drug company would provide manipulated data to federal regulators in order to rush its product to market, reap federal perks, and charge the highest amount in American history for its medication."

Housing 
In April 2019, Blumenthal was one of 41 senators to sign a bipartisan letter to the housing subcommittee praising the Department of Housing and Urban Development's Section 4 Capacity Building program as authorizing "HUD to partner with national nonprofit community development organizations to provide education, training, and financial support to local community development corporations (CDCs) across the country" and expressing disappointment that Trump's budget "has slated this program for elimination after decades of successful economic and community development." The senators wrote that they hoped the subcommittee would support continued funding for Section 4 in Fiscal Year 2020.

Immigration 
In August 2018, Blumenthal was one of 17 senators to sign a letter spearheaded by Kamala Harris to United States Secretary of Homeland Security Kirstjen Nielsen demanding that the Trump administration take immediate action in attempting to reunite 539 migrant children with their families, citing each passing day of inaction as intensifying "trauma that this administration has needlessly caused for children and their families seeking humanitarian protection."

In April 2019, Blumenthal was one of six Democratic senators to sign a letter to Acting Defense Secretary Patrick M. Shanahan expressing concern over memos by Marine Corps General Robert Neller in which Neller critiqued deployments to the southern border and funding transfers under Trump's national emergency declaration as having posed an "unacceptable risk to Marine Corps combat readiness and solvency" and noted that other military officials had recently stated that troop deployment did not affect readiness. The senators requested Shanahan explain the inconsistencies and that he provide both "a staff-level briefing on this matter within seven days" and an explanation of how he would address Neller's concerns.

In June 2019, following the Housing and Urban Development Department's confirmation that DACA recipients did not meet eligibility for federal backed loans, Blumenthal and 11 other senators introduced The Home Ownership Dreamers Act, legislation that mandated that the federal government was not authorized to deny mortgage loans backed by the Federal Housing Administration, Fannie Mae, Freddie Mac, or the Agriculture Department solely due to an applicant's immigration status.

In June 2019, Blumenthal and six other Democratic senators led by Brian Schatz sent letters to the Government Accountability Office along with the suspension and debarment official and inspector general at the US Department of Health and Human Services citing recent reports that showed "significant evidence that some federal contractors and grantees have not provided adequate accommodations for children in line with legal and contractual requirements" and urging government officials to determine whether federal contractors and grantees were in violation of contractual obligations or federal regulations and should thus face financial consequences.

In July 2019, following reports that the Trump administration intended to end protections of spouses, parents and children of active-duty service members from deportation, Blumenthal was one of 22 senators to sign a letter led by Tammy Duckworth arguing that the program allowed service members the ability "to fight for the United States overseas and not worry that their spouse, children, or parents will be deported while they are away" and that the program's termination would cause personal hardship for service members in combat.

In July 2019, Blumenthal and 15 other Senate Democrats introduced the Protecting Sensitive Locations Act, which mandated that ICE agents get approval from a supervisor before engaging in enforcement actions at sensitive locations except in special circumstances and that agents receive annual training in addition to being required to annually report enforcement actions in those locations.

Infrastructure 
In June 2019, Blumenthal was one of eight senators to sponsor the Made in America Act, legislation that would mandate that federal programs that had funded infrastructure projects not currently subject to Buy America standards use domestically produced materials. Bill cosponsor Tammy Baldwin said the bill would strengthen Buy America requirements and that she was hopeful both Democrats and Republicans would support "this effort to make sure our government is buying American products and supporting American workers."

Journalism 
In July 2019, Blumenthal cosponsored the Fallen Journalists Memorial Act, a bill introduced by Ben Cardin and Rob Portman that would create a new memorial that would be privately funded and constructed on federal lands within Washington, D.C., in order to honor journalists, photographers, and broadcasters who died in the line of duty.

LGBT rights 
In September 2014, Blumenthal was one of 69 members of the US House and Senate to sign a letter to then-FDA commissioner Sylvia Burwell requesting that the FDA revise its policy banning donation of corneas and other tissues by men who have had sex with another man in the preceding 5 years.

In June 2019, Blumenthal was one of 18 senators to sign a letter to United States Secretary of State Mike Pompeo requesting an explanation of a State Department decision not to issue an official statement that year commemorating Pride Month or the annual cable outlining activities for embassies commemorating Pride Month. They also asked why the LGBTI special envoy position had remained vacant and asserted that "preventing the official flying of rainbow flags and limiting public messages celebrating Pride Month signals to the international community that the United States is abandoning the advancement of LGBTI rights as a foreign policy priority."

Maternal mortality 
In May 2019, Blumenthal was one of six senators to cosponsor the Healthy MOMMIES Act, legislation that would expand Medicaid coverage in an attempt to provide comprehensive prenatal, labor and postpartum care with an extension of the Medicaid pregnancy pathway from 60 days to a full year following birth to assure new mothers access to services unrelated to pregnancy. The bill also directed Medicaid and the Children's Health Insurance Program's Payment and Access Commission to report its data regarding doula care coverage under state Medicaid programs and develop strategies aimed at improving access to doula care.

Net neutrality 
In May 2014, days before the FCC was scheduled to rewrite its net neutrality rules, Blumenthal was one of 11 senators to sign a letter to FCC Chairman Tom Wheeler charging Wheeler's proposal with destroying net neutrality instead of preserving it and urging the FCC to "consider reclassifying Internet providers to make them more like traditional phone companies, over which the agency has clear authority to regulate more broadly."

In March 2018, Blumenthal was one of ten senators to sign a letter spearheaded by Jeff Merkley lambasting a proposal from FCC Chairman Ajit Pai that would curb the scope of benefits from the Lifeline program during a period where roughly 6.5 million people in poor communities relied on Lifeline to receive access to high-speed internet, claiming that it was Pai's "obligation to the American public, as the Chairman of the Federal Communications Commission, to improve the Lifeline program and ensure that more Americans can afford access, and have means of access, to broadband and phone service." The senators also advocated insuring that "Lifeline reaches more Americans in need of access to communication services."

Railroad safety 
In June 2019, Blumenthal was one of ten senators to cosponsor the Safe Freight Act, a bill that would mandate all freight trains have one or more certified conductors and one certified engineer on board who can collaborate on how to protect both the train and people living near the tracks. The legislation was meant to correct a rollback of the Federal Railroad Administration on a proposed rule intended to establish safety standards.

SafeSport
In February 2022, on a Nightline program on criticisms of the United States Center for SafeSport titled "Sports misconduct watchdog faces crisis of confidence", Blumenthal said: "There is simply no way that SafeSport can be given a passing grade", that "these young athletes deserve better protection", and that SafeSport does not have his confidence and trust. He and Senator Jerry Moran said that they believe that more transparency is required from SafeSport, which does not make its investigative findings or arbitration decisions public, to protect young athletes, and that SafeSport must make its work public.

Special Counsel investigation 
In March 2019, after Attorney General William Barr released a summary of the Mueller report, Blumenthal said the issue was about "obstruction of justice, no exoneration there, and the judgment by William Barr may have been completely improper" and that he did not "deeply respect and trust the Barr summary, which was designed to frame the message before the information was available." After the Justice Department publicly released the redacted version of the report the following month, Blumenthal said, "What's demonstrated in powerful and compelling detail in this report is nothing less than a national scandal. This report is far from the end of the inquiry that this country needs and deserves. It is the beginning of another chapter."

In April 2019, Blumenthal was one of 12 Democratic senators to sign a letter led by Mazie Hirono that questioned Barr's decision to offer "his own conclusion that the President's conduct did not amount to obstruction of justice" and called for both the Justice Department's inspector general and the Office of Professional Responsibility to launch an investigation into whether Barr's summary of the Mueller report and his April 18 news conference were misleading.

Telecommunications 
In April 2019, Blumenthal was one of seven senators to sponsor the Digital Equity Act of 2019, legislation establishing a $120 million grant program that would fund both the creation and implementation of "comprehensive digital equity plans" in each U.S. state along with providing a $120 million grant program to give support toward projects developed by individuals and groups. The bill also gave the National Telecommunications and Information Administration (NTIA) the role of evaluating and providing guidance toward digital equity projects.

Personal life
On June 27, 1982, Blumenthal married Cynthia Malkin. They were engaged during her senior year at Harvard and married the following year. She is the daughter of Peter L. Malkin and maternal granddaughter of Lawrence Wien. They have four children. Their son Matt Blumenthal was elected to the Connecticut House of Representatives from the 147th district in 2018.

Blumenthal's wealth exceeds $100 million, making him one of the richest members of the Senate. His family's net worth is derived largely from his wife; the Malkins are influential real estate developers and property managers with holdings including an ownership stake in the Empire State Building.

Electoral history

Connecticut Legislature

Connecticut Attorney General

U.S. Senator

See also 
 List of Jewish members of the United States Congress
 List of law clerks of the Supreme Court of the United States (Seat 2)

References

Further reading
Altimari, Dave and Mahony, Edmund (January 30, 2010). Computer Firm Owner Awarded $18 Million In Countersuit Against State . Courant.com. Retrieved February 7, 2010.
Mosher, James (December 27, 2009). Don't outlaw our stoves, Eastern Connecticut farmers urge, Attorney general: Burning wood outside pollutes air. NorwichBulletin.com. Retrieved January 6, 2010.
Pesci, Donald (December 10, 2009). Blumenthal: worst Attorney General in U.S.. RegisterCitizen.com. Retrieved January 6, 2010.
Baue, William (July 9, 2002). Connecticut Fights to Keep Stanley Works from Disappearing to Bermuda. Socialfunds.com. Retrieved September 5, 2004.
Connecticut Attorney General's Office (August 14, 1997). Governor, Attorney General Urge Tighter Restrictions on Air Pollution. Press release. Retrieved September 5, 2004.
Connecticut Attorney General's Office (October 15, 2001). Attorney General Submits Comments To FERC Opposing Formation Of Regional Transmission Organization. Press release. Retrieved September 5, 2004.
Connecticut Attorney General's Office (May 10, 2002). Lawsuit Filed By Blumenthal, Nappier Brings Halt To Stanley Works' Reincorporation Plans. Press release. Retrieved September 5, 2004.
Connecticut Attorney General's Office (June 3, 2002). Attorney General Asks SEC To Investigate Stanley Works Vote. Press release. Retrieved September 5, 2004.
Connecticut Attorney General's Office (September 30, 2003). Blumenthal, New England AGs And Consumer Advocates Warn That Proposed RTO Will Raise Rates, Without Consumer Benefit. Press release. Retrieved September 5, 2004.
Connecticut Attorney General's Office (October 27, 2003). Connecticut and 11 Other States File Suit to Prevent Weakening of the Clean Air Act. Press release. Retrieved September 5, 2004.
Patrick, Mike (October 10, 2003). Law School lauds Blumenthal with public service award. QUDaily. Retrieved September 5, 2004.
Sorry, Stanley - editorial (May 9, 2003). Wall Street Journal, cited from the article at The Center for Freedom and Prosperity, The Wall Street Journal, May 9, 2003. Retrieved September 5, 2004.
Peterson, Paul; White, David; Doolittle, Nick; & Roschelle, Amy (September 29, 2003) of Synapse, Energy Economics Inc. FERC's Transmission Pricing Policy: New England Cost Impacts. Report commissioned by Connecticut Attorney General's Office.
Subcommittee on Select Revenue Measures of the House Committee on Ways and Means (June 6, 2002). Statement of the Hon. Richard Blumenthal, Attorney General, Connecticut Attorney General's Office. Retrieved September 5, 2004.
Subcommittee on Select Revenue Measures of the House Committee on Ways and Means (June 25, 2002). Statement of the Hon. Richard Blumenthal, Attorney General, Connecticut Attorney General's Office, Hearing on Corporate Inversions. Retrieved September 5, 2004.
Plotz, David (September 15, 2000). "Richard Blumenthal: He was supposed to be president. So why is he only Connecticut's attorney general?" . Slate.com. Retrieved January 6, 2010.
Titus, Elizabeth, "Blumenthal predicts Hagel will be confirmed", Politico, 1/13/13. Re: Chuck Hagel's nomination as US Secretary of Defense; Blumenthal seat on Armed Services noted; Blumenthal spoke on Fox News Sunday.

External links

Senator Richard Blumenthal official U.S. Senate website
Blumenthal for Senate  campaign website

|-

|-

|-

|-

|-

|-

|-

|-

 

1946 births
20th-century American politicians
21st-century American politicians
Alumni of Trinity College, Cambridge
Jewish American military personnel
American people of German-Jewish descent
American prosecutors
Connecticut Attorneys General
Democratic Party Connecticut state senators
Democratic Party United States senators from Connecticut
The Harvard Crimson people
Jewish American state legislators in Connecticut
Jewish United States senators
Journalists from New York City
Law clerks of the Supreme Court of the United States
Living people
Democratic Party members of the Connecticut House of Representatives
Military personnel from Connecticut
People from Brooklyn
People from Greenwich, Connecticut
United States Attorneys for the District of Connecticut
United States Marine Corps reservists
United States Marines
Yale Law School alumni
Harvard College alumni
Riverdale Country School alumni
Wien family
21st-century American Jews